Majdan-Obleszcze is a village in the administrative district of Gmina Szastarka, within Kraśnik County, Lublin Voivodeship, in eastern Poland.

References

Majdan-Obleszcze